Danny Marcos Pérez Valdéz (born 23 January 2000) is a Venezuelan footballer who plays as a forward for Zamora on loan from Deportes La Serena.

Career statistics

Club

Notes

References

External links

2000 births
Living people
Venezuelan footballers
Venezuela youth international footballers
Venezuela under-20 international footballers
Venezuelan expatriate footballers
Association football forwards
Deportivo La Guaira players
Zamora FC players
Colo-Colo footballers
Venezuelan Primera División players
Chilean Primera División players
Expatriate footballers in Chile
Venezuelan expatriate sportspeople in Chile